Bakırlı can refer to the following villages in Turkey:

 Bakırlı, Bolu
 Bakırlı, Gönen
 Bakırlı, Şabanözü
 Bakırlı, Seben